Loxoncus is a genus of beetles in the family Carabidae, containing the following species:

 Loxoncus agilis (Peringuey, 1896) 
 Loxoncus alacer (Dejean, 1831) 
 Loxoncus ampandrandavae (Basilewsky, 1977) 
 Loxoncus angustatus (Chaudoir, 1878) 
 Loxoncus arrowi (Jedlicka, 1935) 
 Loxoncus basilewskyi (Lecordier, 1978) 
 Loxoncus circumcinctus (Motschulsky, 1858) 
 Loxoncus coliensis A.Serrano, 1999 
 Loxoncus discophorus (Chaudoir, 1852) 
 Loxoncus elevatus Schmidt-Goebel, 1846 
 Loxoncus gynuis Kataev, 2002 
 Loxoncus hiekei Kataev, 2002 
 Loxoncus horni (Schauberger, 1938) 
 Loxoncus incisus (Andrewes, 1926) 
 Loxoncus latus (Laferte-Senectere, 1853) 
 Loxoncus madagascariensis (Alluaud, 1917) 
 Loxoncus malaisei Kataev, 2002 
 Loxoncus marginatus (W.J.Macleay, 1888) 
 Loxoncus microgonus (Bates, 1886)
 Loxoncus mocquerysi (Alluaud, 1917) 
 Loxoncus nagpurensis (Bates, 1891) 
 Loxoncus planicollis (Bates, 1892) 
 Loxoncus politus (Schauberger, 1937) 
 Loxoncus procerus (Schaum, 1858) 
 Loxoncus renitens (Bates, 1886) 
 Loxoncus rutilans (Bates, 1889) 
 Loxoncus schmidti Kataev, 2002 
 Loxoncus seyrigi (Alluaud, 1936) 
 Loxoncus sicardi (Jeannel, 1948) 
 Loxoncus subagilis (Basilewsky, 1968) 
 Loxoncus velox (Dejean, 1829)

References

Harpalinae